The Ramón Margalef Award for Excellence in Education was launched in 2008 by the Association for the Sciences of Limnology and Oceanography to recognize innovations and excellence in teaching and mentoring students in the fields of limnology and oceanography. Criteria for the award requires "adherence to the highest standards of excellence" in pedagogy as well as verification that the teaching techniques have furthered the field of aquatic science. The award is not affiliated with the Ramon Margalef Prize in Ecology, often referred to as the Ramon Margalef Award, given by the Generalitat de Catalunya in Barcelona. The award has been presented annually since 2009.

Winners
The winners have included:

The information in this table is from the Association for the Sciences of Limnology and Oceanography.

References 

Science and technology awards
Awards established in 2008
Education awards
2008 establishments in the United States
Oceanography
Limnology